Choi Eun-sil (born 17 August 1994) is a South Korean basketball player for Asan Woori Bank Wibee and the South Korean national team.

She participated at the 2018 FIBA Women's Basketball World Cup.

References

External links

1994 births
Living people
Power forwards (basketball)
People from Cheongju
South Korean women's basketball players
Basketball players at the 2018 Asian Games
Asian Games silver medalists for Korea
Asian Games medalists in basketball
Medalists at the 2018 Asian Games
Sportspeople from North Chungcheong Province